Quadrant in architecture refers to a curve in a wall or a vaulted ceiling. Generally considered to be an arc of 90 degrees (one quarter of a circle), or a half of the more commonly seen architectural feature (a crescent).

The quadrant curve was a feature popularised by Andrea Palladio, who used it often for the wings and colonnades which linked his classical style villas to their service wings and outbuildings. However, curved quadrant buildings should not be confused with the canted facades of Baroque architecture or the slightly curved buildings of the era such as the Quattro Canti in Palermo.

The quadrant vault, a feature of Tudor architecture, is a curving interior, a continuous arc usually of brick as seen in a tunnel, as opposed to a ribbed vault where a framework of ribs or arches supports the curves of the vault. A quadrant arch was often employed in Romanesque architecture to provide decorative support, as seen in the flying buttresses of Notre-Dame de Chartres built in the second half of the 12th century.

During the 18th century, the quadrant once again became a popular design shape for the terraces of smart houses in fashionable spa towns such as Buxton.  Henry Currey's "Quadrant", built to rival the architecture of Bath, is considered one of Buxton's finest buildings.

References 
Jackson-Stops, Gervase (1990). The Country House in Perspective. Pavilion Books. .
A Working Glossary of Architectural Terms,Techniques and Structural Elements retrieved 17 October 2007

House styles
Architectural elements